Jan-Willem Tesselaar (born 21 October 1997) is a football player who plays for ADO '20. Born in the Netherlands, he represents the Anguilla national team.

Club career
He made his professional debut in the Eerste Divisie for Jong FC Utrecht on 16 September 2016 in a game against FC Volendam.

International career
Tesselaar was called up to the Anguilla national team in January 2022 for a friendly against the British Virgin Islands. He and his brother, Brian-Paul, went on to make their international debuts in the eventual 2–1 victory on 27 January. The players qualify to represent the island nation through their grandmother.

Career statistics

International

References

External links
Soccerway profile
 

1997 births
Living people
Dutch footballers
Jong FC Utrecht players
VV Katwijk players
Eerste Divisie players
Netherlands youth international footballers
Association football forwards
People from Den Helder
AFC '34 players
Anguilla international footballers